"Go Right Ahead" is a single by Swedish rock band The Hives, released in 2012. It is the first single taken from their fifth full-length album entitled Lex Hives and is the second listed track from that album. "Go Right Ahead" was released on 3 April 2012 through digital download platforms such as iTunes and Spotify. It was also released as a limited edition 7" vinyl for Record Store Day on 21 April 2012, however, it was available for purchase at the Zia Records tent during the first weekend of the Coachella Valley Music and Arts Festival on 15 April where they were signing records for fans. A live recording of the track was featured on the Adult Swim Singles Program 2012

Background
In the lead up to their announcement of a new single, five teaser videos were gradually posted on their official YouTube channel, each showing a member of the band playing their part of "Go Right Ahead". The song was also played live at the Norwegian/Swedish talkshow "Skavlan", broadcast on 30 March 2012.

The main riff for the song is similar to British group Electric Light Orchestra's (ELO) "Don't Bring Me Down". It was not intentionally copied, but once they realized that the songs sounded alike they contacted ELO's Jeff Lynne, who wrote "Don't Bring Me Down", to get permission to use the riff. As a result, Lynne is credited as one of the song's writers. Lynne was also credited as composer in the album's liner notes.

Music video

Broadcast From RMV
A live music video was released on 9 May 2012 and shows The Hives with additional live members performing the song inside Benny Andersson's (ABBA) Riksmixningsverket (RMV) Studios in Sweden. The concept for this video is a representative in-studio take with the audio recorded as they performed, borne of the band's desire to create something "more realistic than most 'rock videos.'” Randy Fitzsimmons, who is credited with songwriting on every song, can be seen through the studio window wearing a mask.

Official
The official music video was released on 8 June 2012 and was initially only available in Germany, Australia and the UK before it was uploaded onto the band's YouTube channel. It was directed by Swedish design duo Johan Toorell and John Nordqvist of Bold Faces. The monochrome video features The Hives playing the song suspended on board a makeshift stage attached to a Zeppelin and being pulled along the roads of a city.

Track listings

7" vinyl (limited release for Record Store Day)
 "Go Right Ahead" – 3:06
 "1000 Answers" – 2:07

Personnel
The Hives
Howlin' Pelle Almqvist – Vocals
Nicholaus Arson – Lead guitar
Vigilante Carlstroem – Rhythm guitar
Dr. Matt Destruction – Bass guitar
Chris Dangerous – Drums

Additional musicians and personnel
Gustav Bendt – saxophone
Per Ruskträsk Johansson – saxophone
Jonas Kullhammar – saxophone
Janne Hansson – engineer
Michael Ilbert – engineer
Bernard Löhr – engineer
Linn Fijal – assistant engineer
Andrew Scheps – mixing
Stephen Marcussen – mastering

Charts

References

The Hives songs
2012 singles
Adult Swim singles
Black-and-white music videos
Songs written by Jeff Lynne
2012 songs